Antoine-Marie Chenavard (4 March 1787 - 29 December 1883) was a French architect, professor, and road inspector.

Publications 
Voyage en Grèce et dans le Levant fait en 1843-1844, 1849
Compositions historiques, esquisses, 1862
Supplément aux Compositions historiques. Les Poètes, esquisses, 1863
Fontaines, esquisses, 1864
Poètes…, 1873
Sujets tirés des poèmes d'Ossian, 1868
Monuments d'Athènes : recueil de 12 dessins originaux, 1841
Église des Cordeliers de l'observance, 1846
Voyage en Grèce et dans le Levant, 1858
Six vues et détails dessinés à Athènes en 1853, 1857
Lyon antique, 1832

References

French architects
1787 births
1883 deaths